The Peter Witt streetcar was introduced by Cleveland Railway commissioner Peter Witt (1869–1948) who led the transit agency from 1911–1915 and designed a model of streetcar known by his name that was used in many North American cities, most notably in Toronto and Cleveland.

Features
This design was distinguished from other streetcars of the era by its use of the center door as an exit only, with a conductor stationed inside just in front of the door. Passengers could board through the front doors without waiting or paying; they could pay the conductor immediately and sit in the rear of the car (in the nicer seats), or wait in front and pay just before they exited. This had the effect of reducing the car's dwell time at stops, improving schedule times and increasing capacity. Many vehicles were later converted to pay-as-you-enter operation in order to reduce the number of staff needed, but they continued to be known as Peter Witt cars.

History
Witt completed the first prototype in 1914 and filed his patent for the car design in 1915. G.C. Kuhlman Car Company then delivered 130 cars of this design to Cleveland in 1915 and 1916. From this point the design was licensed to a number of cities that needed large capacity trolleys. Toronto Transportation Commission ordered 575 custom Peter Witt cars from 1921 to 1923 and operated them until 1965. Philadelphia Rapid Transit ordered 525 cars from 1923 to 1926, while also converting most of their 1,500 Nearside streetcar fleet to center exit models. Production continued until the introduction of the PCC streetcar in the mid-1930s.

Peter Witt cars were also built in Italy and used in several Italian cities, including Milan, where 200 out of 502 originally built class 1500 cars (introduced in 1928) are still in regular service in 2021. Additionally eleven ex-Milan cars can be seen today on the streets of San Francisco, where they operate on the F Market & Wharves streetcar line. Also in Italy, 30 heavily rebuilt Peter Witt cars are still in use in Naples. Neapolitan prototype cars 901 and 902, built in 1930, and the first series order cars 903–906, built in 1932, were the only Peter Witt cars in use by 1950; they were rebuilt, eliminating the center door and adding a rear door to match the rest of the fleet built from 1932 on. The present rebuilt fleet has some of these cars, though they are no longer in Peter Witt format.

In early 1930s, а group of Soviet engineers from Leningrad headed by designer D. I. Kondratyev visited the United States and, on their return, adapted the American design to the local narrower loading gauge to start local production of the model LM-33 (popularly known as "американка" (Amerikanka, Russian for "an American lady") that was later used in the city for 45 years (in its last decades, together with other tram models), until mid-March, 1979, according to St.Petersburg Museum of the City's Electric Transport.

Besides their continued use in day-to-day service in Milan, San Francisco and (in a rebuilt form) Naples, Peter Witt cars have been preserved in several locations. Gomaco Trolley Company, a US streetcar renovation specialist, has bought 70 ex-Milan cars which it is offering to museums and heritage streetcar operators. A St. Petersburg, Russia, museum has a restored sample of the version once made and used in the city.

Operators
Operators that used Peter Witt streetcars included:

Builders

Gallery

See also

 Peter Witt (Toronto streetcar)
 LM-33 – Russian version of the Peter Witt
 Birney Safety Car, an alternate contemporary car
 PCC streetcar, successor to the Peter Witt

References

Tram vehicles of Canada
Tram vehicles of Italy
Tram vehicles of Mexico
Streetcars of the United States